The Land Before Time VI: The Secret of Saurus Rock is a 1998 direct-to-video animated adventure musical film and the sixth film in The Land Before Time series about five dinosaurs who live in the Great Valley. It is the first film in which Thomas Dekker is the voice of Littlefoot. This was the second The Land Before Time direct-to-video film to be produced and directed by Charles Grosvenor.

Plot 
One night, Littlefoot's grandfather tells the children stories, the beginning of their world: in the Universe the smoke created the Milky Way Galaxy, and early life on Earth, even a legend about "The Lone Dinosaur", a legendary Longneck (Diplodocus) who protected the Great Valley from the most ferocious Sharptooth (Tyrannosaurus) to ever live. During the fight, the Sharptooth was killed and the Lone Dinosaur suffered a scar across his right eye. Soon after the battle, a huge monolith resembling a sauropod with life-sized Sharptooth teeth arranged around his neck came out of the ground during an earthquake. The dinosaurs called it "Saurus Rock". The legend also states that if anyone damages the monolith, bad luck would descend upon the Valley.

The next day, while the children are playing, Littlefoot accidentally falls off a cliff and is saved by a mysterious Diplodocus named Doc. Littlefoot is intrigued by Doc, who is scarred across one eye and displays prior knowledge of the Great Valley's topography. This causes him to assume Doc is the Lone Dinosaur. He tells his friends this, narrating an apparently extemporaneous legend to support his assumption. Inspired, Cera's infant niece and nephew, twins Dinah and Dana, go to Saurus Rock unnoticed. The next day, a worried Cera informs Littlefoot that Dinah and Dana are missing, and the group deduces where they are headed.

When Littlefoot and his friends finally reach Saurus Rock, they see Dinah and Dana on the top. As they climb up to rescue them, Dinah and Dana fall off the top and land on one of the stone teeth on the monolith that Cera is on, and it suddenly breaks off and crumbles upon landing on the ground nearly hitting Spike. Dinah and Dana start to cry. But Cera tells Dinah and Dana that it is not their fault that Saurus Rock was broken; but Littlefoot's since if he had not been talking about it and Doc, then Dinah and Dana would not have run away in the first place. The twins point out that it was she who told them to get lost due to what happened at the Bubbling Goo. Suddenly, an Allosaurus chases them. The children cross a gorge via a suspended log, but when the Sharptooth tries to follows them, the log breaks under its weight and it falls to its apparent death. On the way home, they are confronted by Cera's father; after Littlefoot tells Cera that the twins are back and says that Cera's father never knew that they ran away. Cera's father comes up and asks Cera if the twins really ran away. Cera says, "Sort of. But they didn't go far". Ducky tells Cera's father that Dinah and Dana went to Saurus Rock. Upon hearing that absurd comment from Ducky, he tells Cera that it was her job to watch the twins but failed. He scolds Cera for not properly caring for the twins. He says that he is very angry and disappointed and tells her to immediately march herself home. Then as Cera marches herself home, he continues with his talk on her that she still must be watched herself. That night, Littlefoot has a nightmare in which he falls off a tooth on Saurus Rock and the entire monolith collapses. Grandpa Longneck comforts his grandson after he wakes up from the nightmare, but Littlefoot asks him of what would happen if Saurus Rock was broken. His Grandpa replies that "bad luck would descend upon the valley".

Over the next few days, incidents of bad luck plague the Valley, starting with the watering hole drying up. Then a tornado hits the valley, causing damage, but Cera saves the twins and Doc also saves Littlefoot. Dinah and Dana tell Cera's father of her courage for saving them, in which he tells his daughter that he is proud of her. Littlefoot's grandfather finds Doc with his grandson. Doc protected Littlefoot from the worst of the storm and his Grandpa thanks him. The adults, however, blame Doc, as the misfortunes apparently occurred after his arrival, while Littlefoot blames himself and his friends, recalling the breaking of Saurus Rock. Eager to exonerate Doc, Littlefoot attempts to take one of the Sharptooth's teeth to replace the broken stone. In the process, he discovers the Allosaurus is still alive. After temporarily escaping the Allosaurus, Littlefoot is attacked by a Tyrannosaurus, with his Grandpa intervening, having been led there by Littlefoot's friends. Soon, the Allosaurus returns and works together with the Tyrannosaurus to take down Grandpa Longneck and easily overpower him. However, Doc comes to the rescue. The sharpteeth charge through and run into the rock spire and fall down. The two long necks work together to pull down the rock tower to crush the carnivores to death. One of the teeth from the Allosaurus falls out, and the children use it to repair Saurus Rock.

Doc departs, remarking that Littlefoot already has a hero on whom to depend on, referring to his Grandpa. Littlefoot asks his Grandpa if the bad luck will finally be over. They both agree that while there is no such thing as bad luck, there is also no harm in making sure. Littlefoot and Cera later build a legend of their own based on this new paradigm, portraying Grandpa Longneck as a hero and savior called "The Brave, Great Dinosaur".

Voice cast 

 Kenneth Mars as Grandpa Longneck 
 Thomas Dekker as Littlefoot
 Anndi McAfee as Cera
 Aria Curzon as Ducky
 Jeff Bennett as Petrie/Spike 
 Kris Kristofferson as Doc
 Miriam Flynn as Grandma Longneck
 John Ingle as Cera's father
 Nancy Cartwright as Dana
 Sandy Fox as Dinah
 Danny Mann as Allosaurus

Songs

Release 
Universal Studios Home Video released it on home video on December 1, 1998.

Reception 

In August 2014, the New York Post ranked each of the 13 Land Before Time films released up to that point and placed The Secret of Saurus Rock at number 11, calling it "boring and uninspired."

Aria Curzon received an award for "Outstanding Young Voice-Over" at the 2002 Young Artist Awards for her role as Ducky in this film, as well as The Land Before Time V, The Land Before Time VII, and The Land Before Time VIII. The movie was nominated for "Outstanding Achievement in an Animated Home Video Production" at the 27th Annie Awards in 1999, losing to Disney's The Lion King II: Simba's Pride, as well as "Most Unwelcome Direct-to-Video Release" at the 1999 Stinkers Bad Movie Awards, beaten by "Bill Clinton's Grand Jury Testimony".

Cultural references 
 Beethoven's 3rd shows some scenes from this film.
 "The Lone Dinosaur" is based on The Lone Ranger.
 The American Dad episode "Who Smarted?" mentions this film, and plays what it purports to be a clip from it at the end. However, the clip is not actually from the film.

References
DVD World Online summary

External links 

 

The Land Before Time films
Direct-to-video sequel films
1998 direct-to-video films
1998 animated films
1998 films
1990s English-language films
Universal Animation Studios animated films
Universal Pictures direct-to-video animated films
Films scored by Michael Tavera
1990s American animated films
Animated films about dinosaurs
1990s children's animated films
Films about tornadoes